BelAZ is a Belarusian UCI Continental cycling team focusing on road bicycle racing.

The team was formed around the Belarus National Track cycling team. With former World Time trial champion Vasil Kiryienka as sports director. 
 	
After the 2022 Russian invasion of Ukraine, the UCI said that Belarusian teams are forbidden from competing in international events.

Team roster

Major wins
2021
 Grand Prix Gazipasa, Raman Tsishkou

References

External links

Cycling teams based in Belarus
Cycling teams established in 2021
2021 establishments in Belarus